Nate Garner (born January 18, 1985) is a former American football offensive tackle. He was drafted by the New York Jets in the seventh round of the 2008 NFL Draft. He played college football at Arkansas.

Early years
He attended Pulaski Robinson High School. He was selected to the PrepStar All-Region IV Team. He was ranked as the No. 138 offensive lineman prospect in the nation by Insiders.com.

Personal life
He was enrolled to Fulbright College of Arts and Sciences and was majoring in sociology while in college.

References

Living people
American football offensive tackles
Arkansas Razorbacks football players
Miami Dolphins players
New York Jets players
Joe T. Robinson High School alumni
People from El Sobrante, Contra Costa County, California
People from Pulaski County, Arkansas
Players of American football from Arkansas
1985 births